Kalindra Walquiri de Carvalho Faria (born July 23, 1986) is a Brazilian mixed martial artist competing in the Women's Strawweight division. Faria most recently competed in the Ultimate Fighting Championship.

Mixed martial arts career

Early career
Before joining the UFC, Faria amassed a record of 18–5–1 in fights against fighters such as Cláudia Gadelha, Karolina Kowalkiewicz and Jessica Aguilar.

Titan FC

In her lone appearance for Titan FC, Faria won the inaugural Titan FC Women's Bantamweight Championship against Carina Damm via unanimous decision.

Ultimate Fighting Championship

In 2017, Faria was set to make her UFC at UFC 216 against Andrea Lee, however as Lee had previously failed a drugs test, USADA required her to be in the testing pool six months before competing, causing her to pull out. Lee was replace by fellow promotional newcomer Mara Romero Borella who submitted Faria in the first round.

Faria next faced Jessica Eye at UFC Fight Night: Stephens vs. Choi on January 14, 2018. She lost the back and forth fight by split decision.

Faria then faced Joanne Calderwood on August 25, 2018 at UFC Fight Night 135. She lost the fight via submission in the first round.

In January 2020, it was reported that Faria was released by UFC.

Post-UFC career
Faria was scheduled to face Sidy Rocha at SFT MMA 21 on February 29, 2020. However, the bout was cancelled due to an unknown reason.

On August 26, 2020, news surfaced that Faria had signed a contract with Taura MMA.

On May 29, 2022, making her first appearance since her UFC release in 2018, Faria won the Brazilian FS Strawweight Championship at Brazilian FS 10,submitting Diná da Silva via rear-naked choke in the first round.

Less than a month later, Faria took on Julia Polastri at Iron Man MMA 24 on June 24, 2022. She lost the bout via unanimous decision.

Championships and accomplishments
Titan Fighting Championships
Titan FC Women's Bantamweight Championship (one time; first, former)

Mixed martial arts record

|-
|
|align=center|
|Lara Procópio
|
|Imortal FC 12
|
|align=center|
|align=center|
|Curitiba, Brazil
|
|-
|Loss
|align="center" |19–9–1
|Julia Polastri
|Decision (unanimous)
|Iron Man MMA 24
|
|align=center|3
|align=center|5:00
|Belem, Brazil
|
|-
|Win
|align="center" |19–8–1
|Diná da Silva
|Submission (rear-naked choke)
|Brazilian Fighting Series 10
|
|align=center|1
|align=center|3:16
|São Paulo, Brazil
|
|-
|Loss
|align=center| 18–8–1
|Joanne Calderwood
|Submission (triangle choke)
|UFC Fight Night: Gaethje vs. Vick 
|
|align=center|1
|align=center|4:57
|Lincoln, Nebraska, United States
|
|-
|Loss
|align="center" | 18–7–1
|Jessica Eye
|Decision (split)
|UFC Fight Night: Stephens vs. Choi
|
|align=center|3
|align=center|5:00
|St. Louis, Missouri, United States
|
|-
|Loss
|align="center" | 18–6–1
|Mara Romero Borella
|Submission (rear-naked choke)
|UFC 216
|
|align="center" | 1
|align="center" | 2:54
|Las Vegas, Nevada, United States
|
|-
|Win
|align="center" | 18–5–1
|Carina Damm
|Decision (unanimous)
|Titan FC 41
|
|align="center" | 5
|align="center" | 5:00
|Coral Gables, Florida, United States
|
|-
|Win
|align="center" | 17–5–1
|Tamires Souza
|Submission (armbar)
|Battle of Kings
|
|align="center" | 1
|align="center" | 1:10
|Ilhéus, Brazil
|
|-
|Win
|align="center" | 16–5–1
|Geisa Silva Sena
|TKO (punches)
|FEMMAESP: Cup 1
|
|align="center" | 1
|align="center" | 3:07
|São Paulo, Brazil
|
|-
|Loss
|align="center" | 15–5–1
|Karolina Kowalkiewicz
|Decision (split)
|KSW 30: Genesis
|
|align="center" | 3
|align="center" | 5:00
|Poznań, Poland
|
|-
|Loss
|align="center" | 15–4–1
|Jessica Aguilar
|Decision (unanimous)
|WSOF 15
|
|align="center" | 5
|align="center" | 5:00
|Tampa, Florida, United States
|
|-
|Win
|align="center" | 15–3–1
|Sanja Sucevic
|Decision (unanimous)
|XFC International 4
|
|align="center" | 3
|align="center" | 5:00
|Osasco, Brazil
|
|-
|Win
|align="center" | 14–3–1
|Laura Balin
|Submission (rear-naked choke)
|MMA Super Heroes 3
|
|align="center" | 2
|align="center" | 2:43
|São Paulo, Brazil
|
|-
|Win
|align="center" | 13–3–1
|Alline Sério
|Decision (unanimous)
|XFC International 2
|
|align="center" | 3
|align="center" | 5:00
|Osasco, Brazil
|
|-
|Win
|align="center" | 12–3–1
|Hellen Bastos
|TKO (knee and punches)
|MMA Super Heroes 2
|
|align="center" | 2
|align="center" | 4:13
|São Paulo, Brazil
|
|-
|Win
|align="center" | 11–3–1
|Carina Damm
|Submission (armbar)
|MMA Super Heroes 1
|
|align="center" | 1
|align="center" | 2:05
|Louveira, Brazil
|
|-
|Win
|align="center" | 10–3–1
|Alessandra Silva
|Submission (armbar)
|Real Fight 9
|
|align="center" | 1
|align="center" | 1:34
|São José dos Campos, Brazil
|
|-
|Win
|align="center" | 9–3–1
|Dayse Santos Nascimento
|Submission (armbar)
|Detonic Fight 2
|
|align="center" | 2
|align="center" | 2:31
|Ouro Fino, Brazil
|
|-
|Win
|align="center" | 8–3–1
|Aline Sattelmayer
|TKO (punches)
|Detonic Fight
|
|align="center" | 2
|align="center" | 2:19
|Monte Sião, Brazil
|
|-
|Win
|align="center" | 7–3–1
|Alline Serio
|Decision (unanimous)
|Pink Fight 2
|
|align="center" | 3
|align="center" | 5:00
|Campos dos Goytacazes, Brazil
|
|-
|Win
|align="center" | 6–3–1
|Maria Elisabete Tavares
|Decision (unanimous)
|Pink Fight
|
|align="center" | 3
|align="center" | 5:00
|Porto Seguro, Brazil
|
|-
|Win
|align="center" | 5–3–1
|Alessandra Silva
|Decision (unanimous)
|Vale Fighting Championship
|
|align="center" | 3
|align="center" | 5:00
|Taubaté, Brazil
|
|-
|Loss
|align="center" | 4–3–1
|Vanessa Porto
|Submission (armbar)
|Recife Fighting Championship 4
|
|align="center" | 1
|align="center" | 3:57
|Recife, Brazil
|
|-
|Draw
|align="center" | 4–2–1
|Jennifer Maia
|Draw
|Power Fight Extreme 4
|
|align="center" | 3
|align="center" | 5:00
|Lorena, Brazil
|
|-
|Loss
|align="center" | 4–2
|Cláudia Gadelha
|Submission (armbar)
|Hard Fight Championship
|
|align="center" | 1
|align="center" | 1:10
|Piracicaba, Brazil
|
|-
|Win
|align="center" | 4–1
|Eloah Ribeiro
|TKO (punches)
|Stigado: Pro Fight 2010
|
|align="center" | 1
|align="center" | 3:52
|Lorena, Brazil
|
|-
|Win
|align="center" | 3–1
|Stefane Pereira
|TKO (punches)
|Okinawa Fight 2
|
|align="center" | 1
|align="center" | 2:03
|São Lourenço, Brazil
|
|-
|Loss
|align="center" | 2–1
|Carina Damm
|TKO (corner stoppage)
|X-Combat Ultra MMA
|
|align="center" | 2
|align="center" | 1:52
|Vitória, Brazil
|
|-
|Win
|align="center" | 2–0
|Joana Nardoni
|TKO (knees and punches)
|Planet Fight
|
|align="center" | 1
|align="center" | 1:26
|Pindamonhangaba, Brazil
|
|-
|Win
|align="center" | 1–0
|Iris Lopes
|TKO (knees and punches)
|Okinawa Fight
|
|align="center" | 3
|align="center" | 0:52
|São Lourenço, Brazil
|

References

External links
 
 

1986 births
Living people
People from Taubaté
Brazilian female mixed martial artists
Ultimate Fighting Championship female fighters
Flyweight mixed martial artists
Mixed martial artists utilizing Muay Thai
Mixed martial artists utilizing Brazilian jiu-jitsu
Brazilian practitioners of Brazilian jiu-jitsu
Female Brazilian jiu-jitsu practitioners
Brazilian Muay Thai practitioners
Female Muay Thai practitioners
Sportspeople from São Paulo (state)